Nickel bis(dimethyldithiocarbamate) is the coordination complex on nickel and dimethyldithiocarbamate, with the formula Ni(S2CNMe2)2 (Me = methyl).  It is the prototype for a large number of bis(dialkhyldithiocarbamate)s of nickel(II), which feature diverse organic substituents, all of which have similar structures.  Nickel bis(dimethyldithiocarbamate) has been marketed as a fungicide and related complexes are used as stabilizers in polymers.

Preparation and structure
The compound precipitates as a black solid upon combining aqueous solutions of salts of nickel(II) and dimethyldithiocarbamate.  In terms of structure and bonding the nickel is square planar, and the complex is diamagnetic.

See also
 Zinc dimethyldithiocarbamate - a related compound where nickel has been replaced with zinc,
 Iron tris(dimethyldithiocarbamate) - a related compound with three dithiocarbamate ligands coordinated to iron.

References

Fungicides
Nickel complexes
Dithiocarbamates